Riverport Railroad, LLC  is a privately owned and operated class III short line railroad that serves a commercial, industrial and distribution complex at the former Savanna Army Depot (Savanna Industrial Park) [1]  located in Savanna, Illinois. At present RVPR owns a little over 359 acres of land and 73 miles of rail on a railroad right-of-way of 664 acres at the Savanna Industrial Park. In total RVPR owna and or controls approximately 1,995 acres

RVPR offers railcar storage of us to 2,700 railcars;, railcar cleaning and repair (Via the RESCAR company and Inserv (TLC Rail Services)); Transloading Services; along with industrial property development.

RVPR interchanges with the Burlington Northern Santa Fe (BNSF) at Robinson Spur, IL. RVPR is currently services twice a week by BNSF with additional days as needed for unit trains.

Roster
RVPR has a unique roster. One of the companies locomotives are Baldwin RS-4-TC that formerly worked with the U.S. Army.

References

Illinois railroads
Standard gauge railways in the United States